Soltanabad (also Romanized as Solţānābād) is a village in Estarabad-e Shomali Rural District, Baharan District, Gorgan County, Golestan Province, Iran. At the 2006 census, its population was 1,368, in 323 families.

References 

Populated places in Gorgan County